The SKS (self-loading carbine of (the) Simonov system, 1945) is a semi-automatic rifle designed by Soviet small arms designer Sergei Gavrilovich Simonov in 1945.

The SKS was first produced in the Soviet Union but was later widely exported and manufactured by various nations. Its distinguishing characteristics include a permanently attached folding bayonet and a hinged, fixed magazine. As the SKS lacked select-fire capability and its magazine was limited to ten rounds, it was rendered obsolete in the Soviet Armed Forces by the introduction of the AK-47 in the 1950s. Nevertheless, SKS carbines continued to see service with the Soviet Border Troops, Internal Troops, and second-line and reserve army units for decades.

The SKS was manufactured at Tula Arsenal from 1945 to 1958, and at the Izhevsk Arsenal from 1953 to 1954, resulting in a total Soviet production of about 2.7 million. Throughout the Cold War, millions of additional SKS carbines and their derivatives were also manufactured under license in the People's Republic of China, as well as a number of countries allied with the Eastern Bloc. The SKS was exported in vast quantities and found favour with insurgent forces around the world as a light, handy weapon which was adequate for guerrilla warfare despite its conventional limitations. Beginning in 1988, millions were also sold on the civilian market in North America, where they remain popular as hunting and sporting rifles.

Design 

The SKS has a conventional layout, with a wooden stock and rifle grip. It is a gas-operated rifle that has a spring-loaded bolt carrier and a gas piston operating rod that work to unlock and cycle the action via gas pressure exerting pressure against them. The bolt is locked to contain the pressure of ignition at the moment of firing by tilting downwards at its rear and being held by a lug milled into the receiver. At the moment of firing, the bolt carrier is pushed rearwards, which causes it to lift the bolt, unlocking it, and allowing it to be carried rearwards against a spring. This allows the fired case to be ejected and a new round from the magazine to be carried into the chamber. The SKS represents an intermediate step in the process towards the development of true assault rifles, being shorter and less powerful than the semi-automatic rifles that preceded it, such as the Soviet SVT-40, but being longer (10 cm or 4in) than AK-series rifles which replaced it. As a result, it has a slightly higher muzzle velocity than those arms that replaced it.

The SKS's ten-round internal box magazine can be loaded either by hand or from a stripper clip. Cartridges stored in the magazine can be removed by pulling back on a latch located forward of the trigger guard (thus opening the "floor" of the magazine and allowing the rounds to fall out). In typical military use, the stripper clips are disposable. If necessary, they can be reloaded multiple times and reused.

While early (1949–50) Soviet models had spring-loaded firing pins, which held the pin away from cartridge primers until struck by the action's hammer, most variants of the SKS have a free-floating firing pin within the bolt. Because of this design, care must be taken during cleaning (especially after long storage packed in cosmoline) to ensure that the firing pin can freely move and does not stick in the forward position within the bolt. SKS firing pins that are stuck in the forward position have been known to cause accidental "slamfires" (the rifle firing on its own, without pulling the trigger and often without being fully locked). This behavior is less likely with the hard primer military-spec ammo for which the SKS was designed, but as with any rifle, users should properly maintain their firearms. For collectors, slamfires are more likely when the bolt still has remnants of cosmoline embedded in it that retards firing pin movement. As it is triangular in cross section with only one way to properly insert it (notches up), slamfires can also result if the firing pin is inserted in one of the other two orientations.

In most variants (Yugoslav models being the most notable exception), the barrel is chrome-lined for increased wear and heat tolerance from sustained fire and to resist corrosion from chlorate-primed corrosive ammunition, as well as to facilitate cleaning. Chrome bore lining is common in military rifles. Although it can diminish precision, its effect on practical accuracy in a rifle of this type is limited.

The front sight has a hooded post. This is attained by moving the elevation slide to the rear of the ladder as far as it will go. The Yugoslav M59/66A1 has folddown luminous sights for use when firing under poor light conditions, while the older M59 and M59/66 do not.

All military SKSs have a bayonet attached to the underside of the barrel, which is extended and retracted via a spring-loaded hinge. Both blade and spike bayonets were produced. Spike bayonets were used on the 1949 Tula Russian SKS-45, the Chinese Type 56 from mid 1964 onward, and the Albanian Model 561. The Yugoslavian-made M59/66 and M59/66A1 variants are the only SKS models with an integral grenade launching attachment.

The SKS is easily field stripped and reassembled without specialized tools, and the trigger group and magazine can be removed with an unfired cartridge, or with the receiver cover. The rifle has a cleaning kit stored in a trapdoor in the buttstock, with a cleaning rod running under the barrel, in the same style as the AK-47. The cap for the cleaning kit also serves as a cleaning rod guide, to protect the crown from being damaged during cleaning. The body of the cleaning kit serves as the cleaning rod handle. In common with some other Soviet-era designs, it trades some accuracy for ruggedness, reliability, ease of maintenance, ease of use, and low manufacturing cost.

Development history
Only a highly trained specialist, such as a sniper, could employ the full-power rifle cartridge to its true potential. Both the Soviet Union and Germany realized this and designed new firearms for smaller, intermediate-power cartridges. The U.S. fielded an intermediate round in the .30 (7.62 mm) U.S., now known as the .30 Carbine; used in the M1 carbine, it was widely used by American forces in WWII but was much weaker than German and Soviet intermediate rounds, and was never intended to replace the .30-06 rifle cartridge.

The German approach was the production of a series of intermediate cartridges and rifles in the interwar period, eventually developing the Maschinenkarabiner, or machine-carbine, which later evolved into the Sturmgewehr 44, which was produced in large numbers during the war, and chambered in the 7.92×33mm Kurz intermediate round.

The Soviet Union type qualified a new intermediate round in 1943, at the same time it began to field the Mosin–Nagant M44 carbine as a general issue small arm. However, the M44, which had a side-folding bayonet and shorter overall length, still fired the full-powered round of its predecessors. A small number of SKS rifles were tested on the front line in early 1945 against the Germans in World War II.

Design-wise, the SKS relies on the AVS-36 (developed by the same designer, Simonov) to a point that some consider it a shortened AVS-36, stripped of select-fire capability and re-chambered for the 7.62×39mm cartridge. This viewpoint is problematic, as the AVS uses a sliding block bolt locking device, while the SKS employs a more reliable tilting-bolt design inherited from the PTRS-41, which was itself taken from SVT-40. The bolt mechanism is one of the defining features of a rifle, having a different bolt means the SKS and AVS merely appear similar in layout, while differing vastly in bolt lockup, caliber, size, and that one has a fixed magazine and the other has a detachable magazine. It also owes a debt to the M44, incorporating the carbine size and integral bayonet.

In 1949, the SKS was officially adopted into the Soviet Army, manufactured at the Tula Armory from 1949 until 1955 and the Izhevsk Mechanical Plant in 1953 and 1954. Although the quality of Soviet carbines manufactured at these state-run arsenals was quite high, its design was already obsolete compared to the Kalashnikov which was selective-fire, lighter, had three times the magazine capacity, and had the potential to be less labor-intensive to manufacture. Gradually over the next few years, AK-47 production increased until the extant SKS carbines in service were relegated primarily to non-infantry and to second-line troops. They remained in service in this fashion even as late as the 1980s, and possibly the early 1990s. The SKS was the standard service rifle used by Soviet Air Defence Forces to guard Anti-Aircraft sites until at least the late 1980s. To this day, the SKS carbine is used by some ceremonial Russian honor guards, much the same way the M14 Rifle is within the United States.

During the Cold War, the Soviet Union shared the SKS design and manufacturing details with its allies, and as a result, many variants of the SKS exist. Some variants use gas port controls, flip-up night sights, and prominent, muzzle-mounted grenade launchers (Yugoslav M59/66, possibly North Korean Type 63). In total, SKS rifles were manufactured by the Soviet Union, China, Yugoslavia, Albania, North Korea, North Vietnam, East Germany (Kar. S) and (Model 56) in Romania. Physically, all are very similar, although the NATO-specification 22mm grenade launcher of the Yugoslav version, and the more encompassing stock of the Albanian version are visually distinctive. Many smaller parts, most notably the sights and charging handles, were unique to different national production runs. A small quantity of SKS carbines manufactured in 1955–56 was produced in China with Russian parts, presumably as part of a technology sharing arrangement. The vast majority of Yugoslav M59 and M59/66s have elm, walnut and beech stocks. Russian SKS's had stocks of Arctic Birch (or "Russian Birch"), and the Chinese were of Catalpa wood ("Chu wood").

In terms of production numbers, the SKS was the ninth most produced self-loading rifle design in history. While remaining far less ubiquitous than the AK-47, both original Soviet rifles and foreign variants can still be found today in civilian hands as well as in the arsenals of insurgent groups and paramilitary forces around the world. The SKS has been circulated in up to 69 countries, both by national governments and non-state actors. In 2016, it was still being widely circulated among civilians and non-state actors in at least five of those countries and remained in the reserve and training inventories of over 50 national armies.

The SKS was to be a gap-filling firearm manufactured using the proven operating mechanism design of the 14.5×114mm PTRS-41 anti-tank rifle and using proven milled forging manufacturing techniques. This was to provide a fallback for the radically new and experimental design of the AK-47, in case it was unsuccessful. The original stamped receiver AK-47 had to be quickly redesigned to use a milled receiver which delayed production, and extended the SKS carbine's service life.

Service history

A few years after the SKS was brought into service in 1949, it was rendered obsolete for the Soviet military by the new AK-47, which was adopted in increasing numbers by Soviet front-line units throughout the 1950s. The SKS was used by Soviet troops and Hungarian partisans alike during the 1956 Hungarian Revolution. Thereafter, while the SKS was retained for various auxiliary duties, it ceased to have any real military significance in the Soviet Union. Only a small number remained in active service, mostly with support units, until the 1980s. However, the SKS found a longer second life in the service of various Soviet-aligned nations, in particular the People's Republic of China. The Chinese state manufactured it for decades after production had ceased in the Soviet Union, mainly to arm its vast military reserves and militia forces. The SKS was also in general issue with regular units of the People's Liberation Army (PLA) for thirty years as the Type 56 carbine. PLA forces armed primarily with Type 56 carbines fought Soviet troops armed primarily with AK-47s during the Sino-Soviet border conflict.

Prior to adopting domestic AK-47 derivatives, a number of non-aligned nations such as Egypt and Yugoslavia adopted the SKS as a standard service rifle. The Egyptian Army used the SKS extensively during the Suez Crisis, and a number were captured and evaluated by Western intelligence agencies in the aftermath of that conflict.

Beginning in the 1960s, vast quantities of obsolete and redundant SKS carbines from military reserve stocks were donated by the Soviet Union and the People's Republic of China to left-wing guerrilla movements around the world. The increasing ubiquity of the SKS altered the dynamics of asymmetric warfare in developing nations and colonial territories, where most guerrillas had previously been armed with bolt-action rifles. For example, the SKS served as one of the primary arms of the Viet Cong during the Vietnam War. The weapon type was encountered so frequently by the United States Armed Forces in Vietnam that captured examples were used by opposing force (OPFOR) units during training exercises designed to simulate battlefield conditions there as early as 1969. Captured SKS carbines were also prized as war trophies among individual US military personnel, and a number were brought back to the United States by returning veterans over the course of the Vietnam conflict.

The SKS found particular favour in southern Africa, where it was used by a number of insurgent armies fighting to overthrow colonial rule in Angola, Rhodesia (Zimbabwe), and South West Africa (Namibia). The National Union for the Total Independence of Angola (UNITA) used the Type 56 Chinese variant during its long-running insurgency against the postcolonial Angolan government from 1975 to 2002. The SKS was also used in large quantities by uMkhonto we Sizwe (MK), armed wing of the African National Congress (ANC) in South Africa. Between 1963 and 1990, the Soviet Union shipped 3,362 SKS carbines to MK through the guerrillas' external sanctuaries in Angola and Tanzania. SKS carbines captured from MK by the South African security forces were used to arm militias of the Inkatha Freedom Party (IFP) during its internal power struggle with the ANC in the 1980s and 1990s.

A number of Type 56 carbines were acquired and used alongside the more ubiquitous AK-pattern rifles by the Provisional Irish Republican Army during the Troubles. During the Dhofar Rebellion, SKS carbines were smuggled into Oman by sea, most likely by the Soviet bloc, to arm Popular Front for the Liberation of Oman (PFLO) insurgents there. The Communist Party of Thailand (CPT) used the SKS during its insurgency until the early 1980s, when it ceased militant operations. Cuban and Grenadian military forces used SKS carbines during the 1983 US invasion of Grenada. The US Army captured 4,074 SKS carbines during the invasion, mostly from arms depots.

By the early 1980s, the SKS had been almost entirely superseded in worldwide military service by the AK-47 and its derivatives. The increasing proliferation of cheap AK-pattern rifles in most asymmetric conflicts also ended the popularity of the SKS as a standard guerrilla arm. At that time, the majority of the remaining carbines still in active use were being issued to state-sponsored militias and other paramilitary formations for internal security duties. Following the dissolution of the Soviet Union, SKS carbines proliferated in various civil wars and regional conflicts throughout the former Soviet republics, including the War in Abkhazia, War of Dagestan, and the War in Donbas. In 2016, the SKS remained in the reserve stockpiles of over 50 national armies, mostly in sub-Saharan Africa and the former Soviet bloc.

Variants
After World War II, the SKS design was licensed or sold to a number of the Soviet Union's allies, including China, Yugoslavia, Albania, North Korea, North Vietnam, East Germany, Romania, Bulgaria and Poland. Most of these nations produced nearly identical variants, with the most common modifications being differing styles of bayonets and the 22 mm rifle grenade launcher commonly seen on Yugoslavian models.

Soviet
Differences from the "baseline" late Russian Tula Armory/Izhevsk Armory SKS:

 Variations (1949–1958): Early Spike-style bayonet (1949) instead of blade-style. Spring-return firing pin was present on early models, and they did not have chrome bores (1949 – early 1951). The gas block had three changes: The first production stage gas block, used from 1949 through early 1950, was squared-off at a 90-degree angle. The second gas block production stage was instead cut at a 45-degree angle, seen on late 1950 to 1951 rifles. The third and final gas block stage, from 1952 through to 1956, was curved inward slightly toward the action.
 Honor Guard: All-chrome metal parts, with a lighter-colored wood stock.
OP-SKS. Many military surplus Soviet SKS were converted into hunting rifles by the Molot ("Hammer") factory in Vyatskiye Polyany (Russian: Вятско-Полянский машиностроительный завод «Молот», English: Vyatskiye Polyany Machine-Building Plant). These were labeled OP (OP = охотничье-промысловый > okhotnich'ye-promyslovyy > "commercial hunting (carbine)"). The OP-SKS continued to be manufactured into the 2000s.

Chinese

 Type 56 (1956–today): Numerous minor tweaks, including lack of milling on the bolt carrier, partially or fully stamped (as opposed to milled) receivers, and differing types of thumb rest on the take down lever. The Chinese continually revised the SKS manufacturing process, so variation can be seen even between two examples from the same factory. All of the Type 56 carbine rifles have been removed from military service, except a few being used for ceremonial purposes and by local Chinese Militias. Type 56 carbines with serial numbers below 9,000,000 have the Russian-style blade-type folding bayonet, while those 9,000,000 and higher have a "spike" type folding bayonet. Some early examples are known as "Sino-Soviet", meaning they were produced by China, but with cooperation from Russian "advisers" who helped regulate the factories and provided the design specifications and perhaps even Soviet-manufactured parts. Bangladesh Ordnance Factories produced Type 56 under license until 2006. 
 Experimental stamped receiver: Very rare. A small number of Type 56 SKS rifles were manufactured with experimental stamped sheet metal receivers as a cost and weight saving measure but did not enter large scale production.
 Honor Guard: Mostly, but not all, chromed metal parts. Does not generally have the lighter-colored stock as the Soviet Honor Guard variant.
 Type 63, 68, 73, 81, 84: these rifles shared features from several East-Bloc rifles (SKS, AK-47, Dragunov). AK-47 style rotary bolt and detachable magazine. The Type 63 featured a stamped sheet-steel receiver. The Type 81 is an upgraded Type 63 with a three-round burst capability, some of which (Type 81–1) have a folding stock. The Type 84 (known as an SKK) returns to semi-auto fire only, is modified to accept AK-47 magazines, and has a shorter  paratrooper barrel. However, Chinese Type 84s could not accept AK mags without some handfitting, and the mags were serialized. In addition, AK mags don't work with the SKS bolt-hold-open system, so the Type 84 used a button on top of the bolt carrier to lock it into place.

 Commercial production: Blonde wood ("Chu wood"/"Qiu wood") stock instead of dark wood, spike bayonet instead of blade, bayonet retaining bolt replaced with a rivet. Sub-variants include the M21, "Cowboy's Companion", Hunter, Models D/M, Paratrooper, Sharpshooter, and Sporter. 
 Model D rifles used military style stocks and had bayonet lugs (although some were imported eliminated bayonet, and some examples eliminated the lug to meet changing US import restrictions).
 Model M rifles had no bayonet lug and used either a thumb hole or Monte Carlo–style stock. Both Model D and M used AK-47 magazines and as a result had no bolt hold open feature on the rifle.

Other European
 Romanian M56: Produced between 1957 and 1960. Typically, they are identical or nearly identical to the late Soviet model.
Polish SKS (ksS): Refurbished Soviet rifles. Polish laminated stocks lack storage area in back of stock for cleaning kit. A few hundred SKS's were given to Poland by the Soviet Union around 1954. While never adopted for use by combat units, the SKS is still in use in ceremonial units of the Polish Army, Air Force, Navy where they replaced SVT rifles. Honor guards of the Polish Police and Border Guard also use SKS carbines. In Polish service they are known as ksS which stands for karabin samopowtarzalny Simonowa, Simonov's semi-automatic rifle. These rifles since have been slowly replaced by the new Polish rifle design, the MSBS.
 Yugoslavian PAP M59: Manufactured by Zastava Arms between 1959 and 1966. Barrel is not chrome-lined. PAP stands for "Polu-automatska puška" (Semi-automatic rifle) and the rifle was nicknamed "Papovka". Otherwise this rifle is nearly identical to the Soviet version. Many were converted to the M59/66 variant during refurbishment.

 Yugoslavian PAP M59/66: Produced between 1967 and 1989. Added 22 mm rifle grenade launcher which appears visually like a flash suppressor or muzzle brake on the end of the barrel. Front sight has a fold-up "ladder" for use in grenade sighting. To raise the grenade sight, the gas port must be manually blocked and the action must be manually cycled—rifle grenades must be fired with special blank cartridges, and this feature helps ensure that the gas pressure is not wasted on cycling the action. The gas port must be manually opened to again allow semi-automatic operation. Barrel was not chrome-lined. Both the grenade launcher and grenade sight are NATO spec. Stock is typically made from beech wood.
 Yugoslavian PAP M59/66A1: Same as above, except with the addition of flip up phosphorescent or tritium night sights.
 Albanian SKS: Produced between 1967 and 1978. There were no rifles produced from 1972 to 1975. Produced by the UM GRAMSH factory located in Gramsh, Albania. Longer stock and handguard on the gas tube, and AK style charging handle. The magazine is slightly different in the shape visible from the outside. The stock has two compartments with two corresponding holes in the buttplate for cleaning implements instead of the single cleaning kit pocket. Like the Chinese Type 56 carbine, the Albanian version also features a spike bayonet fixed beneath the muzzle.
 East German Karabiner-S: Extremely rare. Slot cut into back of stock for pull-through sling, similar to the slot in a Karabiner 98k. No storage area in back of stock or storage for cleaning rod under barrel. It is believed to have been produced at the J.P. Sauer & Sohn facility in Suhl.

Other Asian
 North Korean Type 63: At least three separate models were made. One "standard" model with blade bayonet, and a second with a gas shutoff and a grenade launcher, similar to the M59/66. The North Korean grenade launcher was detachable from the muzzle and the gas shutoff was different from the Yugoslavian model, however. A third model appears to have side-swinging bayonet.
 Vietnamese Type 1: Nearly identical to both the Soviet and early Chinese SKS. These are identified by a small star on the receiver with a 1 in the center. The barrel is chromed, as are many of the internal parts. It is unknown currently whether there are spiked bayonets or only bladed. The stock work is identical to more common SKS variants such as the Soviet and Chinese. These appear to have been either converted Soviet or early production models, or simply cloned from these rifles. They were made in a small arms factory with Chinese assistance located 12 km north of Yên Bái with 6,000 SKS rifles made between 1962 and 1965 when the factory was closed to American bombing raids.
 Vietnamese clone: The Viet Cong manufactured somewhat rudimentary copies of the SKS, which are sometimes seen with crude finish and obvious tool markings.

Conflicts

In the more than 70 years of use worldwide, the SKS has seen use in conflicts all over the world.

 Algerian War
Bangladesh Liberation War
 Suez crisis
 Vietnam War
 Hungarian Revolution of 1956
 Portuguese Colonial War
 Rhodesian Bush War
 South African Border War
 The Troubles
 Sino-Soviet border conflict
 Ethiopian Civil War
 Lebanese Civil War
Shaba II
 Soviet–Afghan War
 Tuareg rebellion (1990–1995)
 Yugoslav Wars
 War in Abkhazia (1992–1993)
 Algerian Civil War
 Burundian Civil War
 Republic of the Congo Civil War (1997–99)
 1999 East Timorese crisis
 Iraq War
 Kivu conflict
 Northern Mali conflict
 War in Donbas (2014–2022)

Users

 – ceremonial purposes

 – Bangladesh Ordnance Factories produced Chinese Type 56 under license till 2006. Currently used by BGB, police and BNCC.

: National Guards Unit
Burundi

: Type 56 variant. Used for ceremonial purposes.
: Type 56 variant.

Democratic Forces for the Liberation of Rwanda (in Democratic Republic of Congo)
 – ceremonial purposes

- ceremonial purposes

: used by the Palestinian Honor Guard. SKS were also used by PLO troops in the 1970s
 – ceremonial use
 – ceremonial purposes
: Used as ceremonial rifle

 – ceremonial purposes

: Ceremonial and militia purposes.

: Zastava M59 variant.
: Type 56 variant; ceremonial and militia purposes.

Former users

: Type 56 variant.

Commercial sales and sporting use

United States

Initially, the SKS was a rarity in the US, with the only examples being souvenirs brought back by returning veterans of the Vietnam War. Beginning in 1988, thousands of surplus and newly manufactured Chinese Type 56 carbines were imported in the US. Russia also began exporting the SKS to the US during the early 1990s as well. 

Due to the high volume of initial imports, the SKS became one of the most affordable centerfire rifles available to American sports shooters, retailing at an average of $70 per weapon in 1994. Between 1988 and 1998, several million SKS carbines had been sold on the commercial market in the US.

Canada
The SKS rifle is very popular in Canada, with some users referring to it as “Canada’s rifle.”
While the SKS is imported for commercial sales in Canada, it is affected by Canadian firearms legislation, which prohibits high capacity magazines.

Under Canadian law, the SKS is classified as a non-restricted firearm provided the magazine has been modified to accept five rounds or retrofitted with entirely new five-shot magazines. When the Liberal government of Justin Trudeau introduced an amendment to the pending Bill C-21 that would have expanded and changed the basis for classifying assault weapons under the law, the resulting ban on the SKS was a particular point of contention because it is widely used for hunting, notably by First Nations in Canada. The leadership of the Assembly of First Nations voted unanimously to express opposition to the amendment. The amendment was eventually withdrawn due to the widespread opposition.

See also
 vz. 52 rifle

References

External links

Soviet SKS Operation Manual from 1974
  
Simonov SKS (CKC45g)
Why is the SKS Rifle Popular?

7.62×39mm semi-automatic rifles
Cold War firearms of the Soviet Union
Semi-automatic rifles of the Soviet Union
Weapons and ammunition introduced in 1945
World War II infantry weapons of the Soviet Union
World War II semi-automatic rifles
Carbines
Short stroke piston firearms
Rifles of the Cold War
Infantry weapons of the Cold War
Tula Arms Plant products